The Enhanced Border Security and Visa Entry Reform Act of 2002 is an Act of the United States that deals with immigration. It covers the funding of the Immigration and Naturalization Service (INS), orders that all internal INS databases must be linked together and be fully interoperable with the then-in-development "Chimera" (biometric based) system in order to improve information sharing, makes further regulations in regards to the issuance of Visas, and regulates the inspection and admission of aliens. Currently, much of the Act is yet to be implemented, due to delays in developing the biometric based data system.

References
 
 H.R.3525 - Enhanced Border Security and Visa Entry Reform Act of 2002  United States Congress.

Notes

External links
 H.R. 3525 summary , THOMAS
 Privacy Act of 1974; U.S. Customs and Border Protection--Border Crossing Information, Systems of Records"

United States federal immigration and nationality legislation
Acts of the 107th United States Congress